Arie Supriyatna (born December 25, 1984) is an Indonesian footballer who currently plays for PSMS Medan in the Indonesia Super League.

Club statistics

References

External links

1984 births
Association football forwards
Living people
Indonesian footballers
Liga 1 (Indonesia) players
PSMS Medan players
Indonesian Premier Division players
Persipasi Bekasi players